Adel Al-Muwallad (born 1 April 1997) is a Saudi Arabian football player who plays as a defender.

Career
Al-Muwallad started his career with Medina based club Al-Ansar. He was called up by the Saudi Arabia under-20 national team for the first team in 2015. On 16 November 2015, Al-Muwallad left Al-Ansar and joined Al-Hilal. On 26 August 2018, Al-Muwallad left Al-Hilal and MS League side Al-Jabalain. After making 19 appearances for the club, Al-Muwallad left a season later. On 26 July 2019, Al-Muwallad joined Al-Qadsiah.

Career statistics

Club

References

External links
 

1997 births
Living people
Saudi Arabian footballers
Saudi Arabia youth international footballers
Association football defenders
Saudi First Division League players
Saudi Professional League players
Al-Ansar FC (Medina) players
Al Hilal SFC players
Al-Jabalain FC players
Al-Qadsiah FC players
People from Medina